Alexander Pöllhuber (born 30 April 1985) is an Austrian professional association football player, currently playing for Austrian Football First League side SC Rheindorf Altach as a defender. He is the twin brother of SC Austria Lustenau defender Peter Pöllhuber.

References

1985 births
Living people
Austrian twins
Austrian footballers
Association football defenders
FC Red Bull Salzburg players
FC Admira Wacker Mödling players
SK Sturm Graz players
SV Mattersburg players
SC Rheindorf Altach players
Twin sportspeople